Dominic "Dom" Toretto is a fictional character and one of the two main protagonists of the Fast & Furious franchise. He is portrayed by Vin Diesel and first appeared on film with fellow protagonist Brian O'Conner in The Fast and the Furious (2001). Dominic was created by screenwriter Gary Scott Thompson, who was inspired by an article on street racing that was published in the May 1998 issue of Vibe magazine, while Diesel was heavily sought after to play the character.

As the patriarch of a group of street racers, Dom acts as an influential voice, being forced into the role as primary caregiver following his father's untimely passing. As the leader, he initially worked as an auto mechanic, but eventually progressed to orchestrating carjackings, a multi-million dollar heist, and illicit jobs for government agencies.

Dominic is gruff, strong, and possesses a volatile temper, especially when his family is in danger. He preaches morality and loyalty, and in many cases is also seen to be affectionate and religious. He is married to Letty Ortiz, with whom he raises a son. He is also implied to be the group's strongest and most skilled  racer, a title that is challenged persistently by Brian.

The role propelled Diesel to become a bankable Hollywood star. He won the 2002 and 2014 MTV Movie Awards for Best On-Screen Team with Paul Walker for his performances. Diesel has served as executive producer for the franchise's later installments.

Development
The Fast and the Furious film series was inspired by an article on street racing, "Racer X", that appeared in the May 1998 issue of Vibe magazine. Having witnessed his father's death in a stock car race, Dom is left with the responsibility of taking care of his younger sister, Mia Toretto, and leading the racers dependent on him. Vin Diesel was reportedly paid $2.5 million to star in The Fast and the Furious and $15 million to star in and produce Fast Five.

Appearances
Dominic Toretto is a fearless street racer, auto mechanic, and ex-convict. The character is the older brother of Jakob and Mia Toretto. Throughout the series, Dom's crew has perpetrated many high-speed semi hijackings, stealing millions of dollars in merchandise. He has spent most of his life running from the law. He is married to Letty Ortiz, his longtime wife.

The Fast and the Furious

In the first film, Dom runs his own automotive garage while Mia takes care of the family's grocery store in Echo Park. He also runs his own street race team, which consists of Letty, Vince, Leon, and Jesse. Dominic has a feud with his Vietnamese-American rival Johnny Tran due to a business deal that went sour and Tran catching Dom sleeping with his sister. Unknown to the public, he and his team drive black Honda Civic coupes and stage daring semi hijackings on the freeways, taking home millions of dollars in electronic appliances. He forms a friendship with rookie racer Brian Earl Spilner (Brian O'Conner), who saves him from arrest when the LAPD raid a street race gathering. When showing Brian the 1970 Dodge Charger he had been working with his father before he died, he reveals what happened to the latter: During the last stock car race of the season in 1989, Dominic watched as his father Jack was run off the track by another racer, Kenny Linder, when Linder's car clipped his bumper. Jack was killed instantly when his stock car crashed into the wall at 120 miles per hour and burst into flames. Dominic remembered hearing his father screaming as he burned to death, but the people who witnessed the accident explained that his father had died before his car exploded. Dominic had been the one screaming. A week following the accident, Dominic encountered Linder and when given the opportunity, Dominic attacked Linder, beating him with a wrench. Dominic only intended to hit him once but lost control and kept attacking Linder it until he couldn't lift his arm anymore. The result of Linder's injuries rendered him unable to race, and Dominic was banned for life from the tracks. During the Race Wars, Johnny Tran blames Dominic for a raid by SWAT forces; the SWAT team came into his house, causing disrespect to his family. Dom then attacks him and is promptly led away by Vince, who tells him to "chill out". During a hijacking job gone wrong, Dominic discovers Brian's true identity as undercover LAPD officer named Brian O'Conner. Following a drag race that ends with Dominic's 1970 Dodge Charger getting totalled, Brian hands him the keys to his Toyota Supra, as law enforcement have found out that Toretto has stolen millions in electronics with his crew.  Dom ends up escaping to Mexico, while Brian, now a wanted man himself for aiding a known felon, flees the state.

2 Fast 2 Furious

Dom plays no role in the second film's events, but is only referenced when Brian tells Roman Pearce about him.

The Fast and the Furious: Tokyo Drift

Dom makes a cameo appearance at the end of the film challenging Sean Boswell in a drift race with his gunmetal silver 1970 Plymouth Road Runner, which he won from his late friend Han. 
This film takes place after the events of Fast & Furious 6 and before Furious 7.

Fast & Furious

In Fast & Furious, Dominic, Letty, and their gang lead a successful hijacking of a gasoline tanker in the Dominican Republic, but he abandons them shortly after to keep the authorities away from them. Dominic returns to L.A. upon hearing of Letty's death at the hands of Fenix Calderon. He and Brian once again team up to take down Mexican drug dealer Arturo Braga, who had ordered Letty's execution following a drug run. He later finds out Brian was the last person who had contact with Letty; this enrages him, and he attacks Brian before the latter explains that Letty came to him for help in clearing Dom's name so he could return to Los Angeles. After successfully extraditing Braga back to the U.S., Dom turns himself in to the authorities and is sentenced to 25 years to life in prison without possibility of early parole. However, the bus carrying him is ambushed by Brian, Mia, Rico and Tego; once Dom is sprung from the bus wreckage, the group flees the U.S. as fugitives.

Fast Five

In the fifth, Dominic reunites with Brian, Mia and Vince in Rio de Janeiro, Brazil. They quickly make an enemy of drug lord Hernan Reyes, who has them framed for the murder of three DEA agents during a drug run on a train. As a means to get even with Reyes, Dom and Brian form a team with Roman Pearce, Tej Parker, Han, Gisele Yashar, Rico and Tego to stage a bank heist and steal Reyes' stash of US$100 million in cash. Elite bounty hunter and DSS federal agent Luke Hobbs is sent to Brazil to hunt down and capture Dom and his gang, but when he is ambushed by Reyes' men, during which all of his team are killed, he forms an unlikely alliance with Dom and helps the gang execute their heist. Vince is badly wounded during the gunfight and later succumbs to his injuries. After killing Reyes, Hobbs allows Dom and his gang to leave Brazil with their stash by giving them a 24-hour window; Dom gives Vince's share of the money to his wife and son. Hobbs' partner Elena Neves also leaves the force and becomes Dominic's new love interest.

Fast & Furious 6

In the sixth film, Dom once again encounters Hobbs, who offers him a job to help him hunt down mercenary Owen Shaw and his crime syndicate; Hobbs also reveals that Letty is alive and working for Shaw. Dom and Brian reassemble their gang (minus Rico and Tego, both of whom are in Monaco) in London for the mission, in exchange for a full pardon for all members and Letty's safe return. During the chase, Dom is shot by Letty, and he later discovers that she is suffering from amnesia as a result of the explosion that nearly killed her in Fast & Furious. He saves her from falling to her death while the gang stops Shaw aboard a military tank on a bridge in Spain. Shaw, however, reveals his backup plan of kidnapping Mia, and uses her as leverage in order to be released from custody and allowed to leave with the top-secret microchip that was removed from the tank. Despite the death of Gisele, Dom and his gang defeat Shaw and kill his men while saving Mia and the microchip in a daring chase at a NATO military airfield. Hobbs grants their pardons, and Dom and his gang move back to his home in L.A. Seeing Dom and Letty back together for good, Elena bids him farewell and returns to working with Hobbs. In a post credit scene, Owen Shaw's elder brother, Deckard Shaw, kills Han in Tokyo and calls Dom with a threatening message.

Furious 7

In Furious 7, it is revealed that Owen Shaw survived the events of the previous film but is comatose, and his older brother Deckard Shaw has gone rogue and is hunting Dom's team. Some time after the events of Tokyo Drift and Fast and Furious 6, Dom and Letty have returned to L.A., but Letty later breaks up with Dom in order to find herself again after her memory loss. Meanwhile, Shaw kills Han in Tokyo (bridging the story between this film and Tokyo Drift) and sends a bomb to Dom's house, blowing it up. After retrieving Han's body from Sean Boswell in Tokyo, a revenge-driven Dom decides to take Shaw down alone, but is stopped by a Covert Ops leader and Hobbs' friend Mr. Nobody. Nobody offers Dom a way to hunt Shaw through a software named "God's Eye"; however he also must save its creator, a hacker named Ramsey, from terrorist leader Mose Jakande and his men. Agreeing to the deal, Dominic, Brian, Letty, Tej and Roman lead a daring rescue  through the mountains of Azerbaijan and succeed in liberating Ramsey from her captors. Ramsey tells them that she sent God's Eye to her friend Zafar in Abu Dhabi. After a successful retrieval of the God's Eye (that also involved Dom and Brian jumping a vehicle through three buildings), they find Shaw's hideout, but are ambushed by Jakande's men; many of Nobody's men are killed and Nobody himself is gravely injured, while Dom and Brian barely escape. Afterwards, Dom decides to take down Shaw and Jakande on their home turf in L.A. Dom and Shaw end up in an intense fight on the rooftop of a parking garage, while Brian and the others distract Jakande and Ramsey initiates a hack to shut down God's Eye for good. They succeeded in doing so, and Jakande is killed  when Dom hooks a bag of grenades onto his chopper (which Hobbs shoots) before crashing his vehicle, causing his friends to believe that he died in the process. Letty then reveals that she has regained her memories of their relationship (which also reveals that they were married somewhere in between the story of Los Bandoleros and Fast & Furious), and Dom recovers from being unconscious. After this, Brian decides to retire from the crew in order to spend time with his family. Dom leaves without saying goodbye, prompting Brian to catch up to him at an intersection, and the two have one last drive before parting ways.

The final drive scene was done to give Brian's role a clean retirement and a send-off after the actor who portrays him, Paul Walker, died in a single vehicle accident back in 2013.

The Fate of the Furious

In the eighth film, Dom and Letty are now living in Cuba, where Dom is approached by a mysterious, seductive woman known as Cipher. After betraying his team during an operation in Berlin to steal an EMP device they were assigned to recover, it is revealed that Cipher — the true mastermind behind both the attempted creation of the Nightshade device in Fast & Furious 6 and the near-theft of the God's Eye hacking device in Furious 7 — has captured Elena and Dom's previously-unknown son, using them as blackmail tools to ensure Dom's cooperation, later letting her right-hand man and second-in-command, Connor Rhodes to kill Elena. Despite Cipher's dismissal of Dom's views on family and her access to multiple surveillance systems, Dom manages to use his contacts to pass on a message to Magdalene Shaw, Deckard and Owen's mother, allowing her to retrieve her sons and send them aboard Cipher's plane via a tracking device slipped into Dom's necklace. Once the Shaws retrieve his son, Dom kills Rhodes, avenging Elena's death before rejoining his team and destroying a Russian nuclear submarine that Cipher was attempting to steal. Although Cipher escapes, Dom vows to Elena to protect their new son, naming the boy Brian after his brother-in-law and best friend.

F9

A now-retired Dom, who is raising little Brian on a farm with Letty, is called by Mr. Nobody to stop a genocide mission led by Dom's estranged younger brother Jakob. It is revealed that Dom banished Jakob from the family because he believed that he caused their father's death by sabotaging the stock car's engine, causing it to burst into flames when it crashed. Dom and Jakob fight each other several times in the film, with Jakob going as far as to wanting Dom to either live under his shadow or get killed. Jakob reveals to Dom that he tampered with the car's engine because their father told him to, as he was trying to throw the race to clear some debts, but his plan went wrong when Kenny Linder hit car with his by using his dirty tactics. Towards the end of the film, however, Dom and Jakob reconcile and team up in the film's final battle in an attempt to defeat Cipher, although she escapes once more. As a way of making amends to Jakob, who had been branded a rogue agent, Dom gives him the keys to his car - just as Brian did for Dom several years ago - allowing him to evade custody.

Characterization
Dominic has been described as "a gruff but affectionate father to his loyal pack of renegades, providing them with barbecue, protection, and a rough moral code to live by." Vin Diesel has described Dominic as "a character who is strong, who is a caretaker." In contrast to Brian's estranged relationship with his father, Dominic is shown to "put family first" and be very protective of Mia. He is also implied to be religious, insisting that all members in a dinner table say grace and that the first person to take a bite must bless the meal.

In The Fast and the Furious, Dominic's volatile temper stems from a painful incident during his teenage years, when his father, a stock car racer, was killed in a race after a driver named Kenny Linder accidentally sent him to the wall at 120 mph. Distraught by his father's death, Dominic assaulted Linder a week later with a torque wrench and left him hospitalized with severe head injuries. Dominic served time (2 years) in prison and was banned from racing for the attack. He nearly replicates the action while fighting Hobbs in Fast Five, only to (purposely) miss Hobbs' head by an inch when Mia begs him to stop.

In Fast Five, Dominic recalls the influence his father had on him. His father would help Mia with her homework everyday and sending her to bed, he would stay up late reading the next chapter, to make sure he could help her the next day. On Sundays, the family would attend church and host a barbecue for the neighborhood; those who did not attend church would not be allowed at the barbecue.

However, Dominic is also obsessed with racing. In the first film, he says: "I live my life a quarter mile at a time. Nothing else matters: not the mortgage, not the store, not my team and all their bullshit. For those ten seconds or less, I'm free." In The Fate of the Furious, Cipher repeats a similar phrase to Dominic to question his loyalty to his family.
Over the course of the series Dom exhibits the strength, stamina, and reflexes of a world-class athlete. He is also an excellent marksman and hand-to-hand combatant.

Cars

Dominic's Charger

In four of the films, Dom drove his deceased father's black 1970 Dodge Charger. In the first film, Dom tells Brian that he and his father built the 900 horsepower car, but that he had never driven it, because it "scares the shit out of [him]." Dom uses it to help Brian by attacking one of Tran's henchmen. He later races Brian's Supra with it; however, he totals it when he collides with a truck.

In Fast & Furious he sees that Letty has rebuilt it for him, as she was hoping that he would return to the United States. Later in the film, Dom takes it to Mexico and shields Brian's car with it, but destroys it by running into a stack of propane canisters in the tunnels. In the final scene of the film, Brian is shown to have rebuilt it, and Dom recognizes the sound of the engine while riding in a prison bus. In Fast Five, it is shown that Brian brakes in front of the bus, causing the bus to collide with it and flip. Dom uses it throughout the film to win cars to test for their vault heist. Meanwhile, Hobbs uses it to track the location of Dom's gang by having his men check camera feeds for a 1970 Charger. When Hobbs comes to arrest Dom, he crashes his Gurkha F5 into his Charger, cutting it in half, which triggers a fight between the pair.

In Furious 7, near the end of the movie he goes to his home which was recently blown up by Deckard Shaw, and in the garage is his Charger covered up. He uncovers it revealing the slightly different new look. He takes the Charger to the top of a rooftop where he faces Shaw in a game of chicken. When the parking lot is later collapsing due to missiles, Toretto ramps it off the building destroying it yet again.

The car appears hoodless in F9.

The car goes through some changes. In the first film, it is chrome trimmed, while in the fourth film it is black trimmed, with an extra grill cover. In the fifth film it is matte black, with black wheels and the supercharger removed. In the seventh film, Torretto's Charger has the supercharger again. The car still has black trim but is no longer matte black but metallic black. Also a different set of rims. In F9, it once again resembles the first film with Silver Trim.

In Fast & Furious 6, Dom gives his nephew Jack a diecast replica of his black Charger, hoping to keep him away from Brian's habits of favoring imports. Later in the film, Dom drives a maroon Dodge Charger Daytona, which is acquired by Tej Parker at a car auction in London. While it is not the same car as his signature black Charger, it is a direct nod to The Charger.

At the very end of Furious 7, Toretto is seen with the Project Maximus Ultra 1968 Dodge Charger.

In The Fate of the Furious, Toretto drives an armoured version of his usual Charger in the film's final confrontation.

Car list

Family tree

References

Action film characters
Fast & Furious characters
Fictional career criminals
Fictional mechanics
Fictional outlaws
Fictional prison escapees
Fictional racing drivers
Film characters introduced in 2001
Male characters in film